The National Arts Council of Tanzania (NACT) is an official parastatal organization established under the National Arts Council Act No. 23 of 1984. It is a government agency for the revival, promotion and development of the arts in Tanzania

External links
 Arts Council of Tanzania

Arts councils
Arts in Tanzania
African art